audite Musikproduktion is an independent classical music record label run by recording engineer Ludger Böckenhoff. Founded in Stuttgart in 1973, AUDITE merged with the Fermate label in 2000, relocating to Detmold in the process, where it is still based today. AUDITE (Listen!, imperative plural of the Latin verb audire = to listen) Musikproduktion is an international provider of classical music sound carriers.

History 
The AUDITE label was founded by Friedrich Mauermann in Stuttgart in 1973. Brother of the former manager of the Bavarian Radio Symphony Orchestra, Erich Mauermann, he established his reputation primarily by releasing archive recordings of the Mahler Symphonies under the chief conductor of the time, Rafael Kubelík. In 2000, Mauermann transferred the AUDITE label to Ludger Böckenhoff, who had owned his own music production company, Fermate, since 1991. As a result of the merger, the label was renamed AUDITE Musikproduktion.

Repertoire and awards 
Starting from the live recordings of the Mahler Symphonies with Rafael Kubelík and the Bavarian Radio Symphony Orchestra which originally represented AUDITE’s core repertoire, the label has gradually developed two focal points whilst maintaining its objective of making available to the public noteworthy repertoire in outstanding interpretations.

Historical archive recordings, issued in close collaboration with the respective broadcasting corporations, remain one of AUDITE's cornerstones. New releases are the other core area, including complete editions (such as Shostakovich String Quartets, Beethoven String Quartets and Piano Trios, Edvard Grieg’s and Robert Schumann's Complete Symphonic Works, Louis Vierne's Organ Symphonies or Felix Mendelssohn's Complete Chamber Music for Strings) as well as new discoveries such as the works of Mendelssohn’s pupil Eduard Franck and his son, Richard Franck.

AUDITE's current catalogue comprises more than 350 titles in CD, SACD and LP formats, available across the globe via respective distributors; in addition, AUDITE releases are available on download and streaming platforms.

AUDITE's recordings have won many awards, including the Preis der deutschen Schallplattenkritik, the Cannes Classical Award, the Midem Classical Award, the International Classical Music Award, the Diapason d'Or and Gramophone Editor's Choice. In 2013, AUDITE was voted Label of the Year by the jury of the International Classical Music Awards.

Artists and ensembles 
Artists and ensembles/orchestras who have recorded for AUDITE include:

 Balkan Chamber Orchestra
 Elisso Bolkvadze
 Sarah O‘ Brien
 Nicolas Bringuier
 Arthur Campbell
 Maria Canyigueral
 Cappella Murensis
 Cheng² Duo
 Marc Coppey
 Josu De Solaun
 Jean-Baptiste Dupont
 Niek de Groot
 Romain Descharmes
 Christiane Edinger
 Moritz Eggert
 Detlev Eisinger
 Laura Ruiz Ferreres
 Hansjörg Fink
 Roland Glassl
 Gerhard Gnann
 Liana Gourdjia
 Hideyo Harada
 Anne-Cathérine Heinzmann
 Thomas Hoppe
 Judith Ingolfsson
 Jacques Thibaud String Trio
 Hisako Kawamura
 Patricia Kopatchinskaja
 Sergej Koudriakov
 la festa musicale
 Les Cornets Noirs
 Elmar Lehnen
 Alexander Lonquich
 Andrea Lucchesini
 Anna Malikova
 Ulrich Roman Murtfeld
 Martin Neu
 Jimin Oh-Havenith
 Guglielmo Pellarin
 Piano Duo Takahashi|Lehmann
 Camilla Tilling
 Franziska Pietsch
 Polish National Radio Symphony Orchestra
 Sophie Rétaux
 Hans-Eberhard Roß
 Andreas Rothkopf
 Salaputia Brass
 Martin Sander
 Christoph Schickedanz
 Herbert Schuch
 Oren Shevlin
 Ina Siedlaczek
 Staatskapelle Weimar
 Vladimir Stoupel
 Johannes Strobl
 Thüringer Bach Collegium
 Trio Lirico
 Dénes Várjon
 Tilmann Wick
 Carsten Wiebusch
 Edinger Quartett
 Mandelring Quartett
 Quartetto di Cremona
 Schweizer Klaviertrio / Swiss Piano Trio
 Trio Testore
 Elina Vähälä
 WDR Sinfonieorchester Köln
 Zagreb Soloists

Artists of archive recordings 
Conductors, singers, instrumentalists and ensembles re-released as part of AUDITE’s archive recordings include:

 Claudio Abbado
 Amadeus Quartet
 Géza Anda
 Peter Anders
 Vladimir Ashkenazy
 Wilhelm Backhaus
 Daniel Barenboim
 Berliner Philharmoniker
 Leo Blech
 Karl Böhm
 Jorge Bolet
 Robert Casadesus
 Sergiu Celibidache
 Shura Cherkassy
 Clifford Curzon
 Solomon Cutner
 Deutsches Symphonie-Orchester Berlin
 Gioconda de Vito
 Dean Dixon
 Jacqueline du Pré
 Christian Ferras
 Annie Fischer
 Dietrich Fischer-Dieskau
 Kirsten Flagstad
 Leon Fleisher
 Maureen Forrester
 Pierre Fournier
 Nelson Freire
 Ferenc Fricsay
 Wilhelm Furtwängler
 Bronislaw Gimpel
 Friedrich Gulda
 Clara Haskil
 Antonio Janigro
 Armin Jordan
 Herbert von Karajan
 Julius Katchen
 Wilhelm Kempff
 Otto Klemperer
 Paul Kletzki
 Hans Knappertsbusch
 Rafael Kubelík
 Pilar Lorengar
 Lorin Maazel
 Igor Markevitch
 Johanna Martzy
 Edith Mathis
 Barry McDaniel
 Yehudi Menuhin
 Nathan Milstein
 Erica Morini
 Zara Nelsova
 Eugene Ormandy
 Quartetto Italiano
 Michael Rabin
 Karl Ristenpart
 Wolfgang Schneiderhan
 Carl Schuricht
 Elisabeth Schwarzkopf
 Schweizerisches Festspielorchester
 Isaac Stern
 Symphonieorchester des Bayerischen Rundfunks
 George Szell
 Paul Tortelier
 Fritz Wunderlich
 Pinchas Zukerman

References

External links 
 
 In memoriam Claudio Abbado _ LUCERNE FESTIVAL

German independent record labels
Classical music record labels